The 2015–16 season is a FC Ararat Yerevan's 25th consecutive season in Armenian Premier League. This article shows player statistics and all official matches that the club will play during the 2015–16 season.

Season events
In June 2015, former players Zaven Bulut and Stepan Ghazaryan both joined Ararat on trial, as did with Roberto Casabella, Benik Hovhannisyan and Sargis Karapetyan, whilst Juliano Gimenez returned to Ararat after playing for them in 2008. After a successful trial period, Casabella signed with Ararat.

On 14 July 2015, Ararat travelled to Krymsk in Russia to conduct a training camp until 27 July. During the camp, Ararat faced Krasnodar on 15 July, Kuban Krasnodar II on 18 July and Anapa team on 23 July. During this training camp, Brazilian forward Felipe Rafael and Hayk Chilingaryan joined Ararat on trial, whilst Sargis Karapetyan signed permanently after previously being on trial.

On 4 September 2015, Ararat announced that they would be taking in a training camp in California in February 2016, during the seasons winter break.

On 17 September 2015, it was announced that all Ararat's home games would now be played at the Republican Stadium, after their previous home ground, the Hrazdan Stadium, was declared bankrupt.

On 20 February 2016, Ararat where defeated 2-0 by New York Cosmos at the Citrus Stadium in Glendora, California.

Squad

Transfers

In

Released

Trialists

Friendlies

Competitions

Premier League

Results summary

Results by round

Results

Table

Armenian Cup

Statistics

Appearances and goals

|-
|colspan="14"|Players who left Ararat Yerevan during the season:

|}

Goal scorers

Clean sheets

Disciplinary Record

References

FC Ararat Yerevan seasons
Ararat Yerevan